There are approximately 18,000 Russian Cypriots living in Cyprus, according to government statistics, many of them in Limassol and are citizens of Cyprus. Guardian estimated the number as 50,000 in 2018.

Russian Cypriots are a minority group on the island. However, almost all of them arrived to or were born in Cyprus following the Dissolution of the Soviet Union, which occurred after the writing of the Constitution of Cyprus, so they are not afforded the same constitutional privileges as other smaller minority groups like Armenian Cypriots, Maronite Cypriots and Roman Catholic Cypriots.

Notable people

Politicians:
 Alexey Voloboev

Foreign investors with dual Russian-Cypriot citizenship:
 Oleg Deripaska
 Konstantin Grigorishin
 Leonid Lebedev
 Nikita Mishin
 Alexander Ponomarenko

See also 

 Cyprus–Russia relations
 Demographics of Cyprus

References

External links
Northern Cyprus forms Russian business lobby

Cypriot people of Russian descent
Russian diaspora